Mullerthal is a village in the commune of Waldbillig, in eastern Luxembourg.  , the village had a population of 62.  It lends its name to the alternative name of a region of eastern Luxembourg, otherwise known as Little Switzerland.

References

Waldbillig
Villages in Luxembourg